Danila Dmitriyevich Khotulyov (born 1 October 2002) is a Russian football player who plays as a centre-back for FC Orenburg.

Club career
He made his debut in the Russian Premier League for FC Zenit Saint Petersburg on 13 March 2021 in a game against FC Akhmat Grozny. He substituted Yaroslav Rakitskyi in the 83rd minute.

On 10 February 2022, Khotulyov joined FC Orenburg on loan until the end of the 2022–23 season. On 9 January 2023, he moved to Orenburg on a permanent basis.

Honours
Zenit Saint Petersburg
 Russian Premier League: 2020–21, 2021–22

Career statistics

Club

References

External links
 
 

2002 births
People from Orenburg
Sportspeople from Orenburg Oblast
Living people
Russian footballers
Russia youth international footballers
Russia under-21 international footballers
Association football defenders
FC Zenit Saint Petersburg players
FC Zenit-2 Saint Petersburg players
FC Orenburg players
Russian Premier League players
Russian First League players
Russian Second League players